Nepal Ratna Man Padavi Madan Kumar Bhandari (27 June 1951 – 17 May 1993), commonly known as Madan Bhandari, was a popular Nepali political leader belonging to the Communist Party of Nepal (Unified Marxist–Leninist), a democratic communist party in Nepal. He defeated the incumbent Prime Minister Krishna Prasad Bhattarai in a landslide victory of 1991 general election. Known for his charismatic style, Bhandari had propounded the popular communist principle or thought "People's Multiparty Democracy". He is widely regarded for peaking the Nepal's communist movement to a greater height. He died in a jeep accident in Dasdhunga, Chitwan, in 1993.

Life
Madan Bhandari was born in the Dhungesangu village of Taplejung district in eastern Nepal. He studied in Medibung School in Taplejung and in Varanasi, India. In 1972, he became a central committee member of the Janabadi Sanskritik Morcha (Democratic Cultural Front), a student movement established by Pushpa Lal Shrestha. Around 1976 he left Pushpa Lal's Communist Party of Nepal to create the Mukti Morcha Samuha ("Liberation Front Group"), which formed an alliance with the survivors of the Jhapa Movement in 1978. He was a founding member of the Communist Party of Nepal (Marxist-Leninist) preceding the 1980 referendum and was elected General-Secretary at its Fourth National Congress in 1986.

Bhandari became the General-Secretary when CPN (ML) merged into the Communist Party of Nepal (Unified Marxist-Leninist) in 1991. He played a central role in the CPN (UML) program of "People's Multiparty Democracy," which left his party as the strongest communist party in Nepal for several years even after his death.

1991 elections and aftermath 
The CPN (UML), under the leadership of Bhandari, won all but one seat in the Himalayan capital in the 1991 elections, the country's first free election after more than three decades. Bhandari proclaimed this "a vote for democracy," "a vote for independence" and "a vote for the alleviation of poverty." He argued for the popular vote as opposed to armed struggle as the main tactic for communists.

Personal life 
Bhandari was married to Bidya Devi Bhandari in 1982. Ms. Bhandari at the time of her wedding to Bhandari was a junior political cadre of his party who later became the first female President of Nepal. The couple had two daughters, Usha Kiran Bhandari and Nisha Kusum Bhandari. Both daughters are married.

Death 
On May 16, 1993 Bhandari died in a car accident in Dasdhunga, Chitwan. According to an investigation led by K.P. Oli, it was not an accident but an unsolved murder. Of the three people inside the car, only the driver Amar Lama survived who was later abducted and killed by a group of unidentified gunmen in Kirtipur, Kathmandu; the two leaders Madan Bhandari and Jibaraj Ashrit died.

His body was recovered three days later and kept in Dasharath Rangashala, where people visited throughout the day and into the night to pay their respects. The only survivor of that crash, driver Amar Lama, was murdered 10 years later. A group of unidentified gunmen abducted Lama from the office of Tajakhabar Weekly tabloid around 13:45. He was taken to the hamlet of Kirtipur on the southwestern outskirts of the capital and shot. The assassins then fled towards Panga village.

Aftermath
A bust has been built at the spot of the accident at Dasdhunga. The government of Nepal proposed to build Madan Bhandari Highway from Shantinagar of Jhapa district to Rupal of Dadheldhura district. In March 2018, Madan Bhandari Museum was inaugurated in Urlabari, Morang. The damaged jeep of the 1993 accident has been kept on display at the Urlabari Museum.

Awards
On 2016, he was posthumously awarded with Nepal Ratna Man Padavi, the highest honour to a Nepali citizen by the Government of Nepal.

See also
Dasdhunga
List of unsolved murders

References

External links

1951 births
1993 deaths
Communist Party of Nepal (Marxist–Leninist) politicians
Communist Party of Nepal (Pushpa Lal) politicians
Male murder victims
People from Taplejung District
Road incident deaths in Nepal
Unsolved murders in Asia
Nepal MPs 1991–1994
First ladies and gentlemen of Nepal